Cubane is a synthetic hydrocarbon compound that consists of eight carbon atoms arranged at the corners of a cube, with one hydrogen atom attached to each carbon atom. A solid crystalline substance, cubane is one of the Platonic hydrocarbons and a member of the prismanes. It was first synthesized in 1964 by Philip Eaton and Thomas Cole. Before this work, Eaton believed that cubane would be impossible to synthesize due to the "required 90 degree bond angles". The cubic shape requires the carbon atoms to adopt an unusually sharp 90° bonding angle, which would be highly strained as compared to the 109.45° angle of a tetrahedral carbon. Once formed, cubane is quite kinetically stable, due to a lack of readily available decomposition paths. It is the simplest hydrocarbon with octahedral symmetry.

Having high potential energy but kinetic stability makes cubane and its derivative compounds useful for controlled energy storage. For example, octanitrocubane and heptanitrocubane have been studied as high-performance explosives.

These compounds also typically have a very high density for hydrocarbon molecules. The resulting high energy density means a large amount of energy can be stored in a comparably small amount of space, an important consideration for applications in fuel storage and energy transport.

Synthesis
The classic 1964 synthesis starts with the conversion of 2-cyclopentenone to 2-bromocyclopentadienone:

Allylic bromination with N-bromosuccinimide in carbon tetrachloride followed by addition of molecular bromine to the alkene gives a 2,3,4-tribromocyclopentanone. Treating this compound with diethylamine in diethyl ether causes elimination of two equivalents of hydrogen bromide to give the diene product.

The construction of the eight-carbon cubane framework begins when 2-bromocyclopentadienone undergoes a spontaneous Diels-Alder dimerization. One ketal of the endo isomer is subsequently selectively deprotected with aqueous hydrochloric acid to 3.  

In the next step, the endo isomer 3 (with both alkene groups in close proximity) forms the cage-like isomer 4 in  a photochemical [2+2] cycloaddition. The bromoketone group is converted to ring-contracted carboxylic acid 5 in a Favorskii rearrangement with potassium hydroxide. Next, the thermal decarboxylation takes place through the acid chloride (with thionyl chloride) and the tert-butyl perester 6 (with tert-butyl hydroperoxide and pyridine) to 7; afterward, the acetal is once more removed in 8. A second Favorskii rearrangement gives 9, and finally another decarboxylation gives, via 10, cubane (11).

A more approachable laboratory synthesis of disubstituted cubane involves bromination of the ethylene ketal of cyclopentanone to give a tribromocyclopentanone derivative.  Subsequent steps involve dehydrobromination, Diels-Alder dimerization, etc.

The resulting cubane-1,4-dicarboxylic acid is used to synthesize other substituted cubanes. Cubane itself can be obtained nearly quantitatively by photochemical decarboxylation of the thiohydroxamate ester (the Barton decarboxylation).

Derivatives

The synthesis of the octaphenyl derivative from tetraphenylcyclobutadiene nickel bromide by Freedman in 1962 pre-dates that of the parent compound. It is a sparingly soluble colourless compound that melts at 425–427 °C.  A hypercubane, with a hypercube-like structure, was predicted to exist in a 2014 publication. Two different isomers of cubene have been synthesized, and a third analyzed computationally. The alkene in ortho-cubene is exceptionally reactive due to its pyramidalized geometry. At the time of its synthesis, this was the most pyramidalized alkene to have been successfully made. The meta-cubene isomer is even less stable, and the para-cubene isomer probably only exists as a diradical rather than an actual diagonal bond.

In 2022, both heptafluorocubane and octafluorocubane were synthesized. Octafluorocubane is of theoretical interest because of its unusual electronic structure, which is indicated by its susceptibility to undergo reduction to a detectable anion , with a free electron trapped inside the cube.

Cubylcubanes and oligocubanes
Cubene (1,2-dehydrocubane) and 1,4-cubanediyl(1,4-dehydrocubane) are enormously strained compounds which both undergo nucleophilic addition very rapidly, and this has enabled chemists to synthesize cubylcubane. X-ray diffraction structure solution has shown that the central cubylcubane bond is exceedingly short (1.458 Å), much shorter than the typical C-C single bond (1.578 Å). This is attributed to the fact that the exocyclic orbitals of cubane are s-rich and close to the nucleus. Chemists at the University of Chicago extended and modified the sequence in a way that permits the preparation of a host of [n]cubylcubane oligomers. The [n]cubylcubanes are rigid molecular rods with the particular promise at the time of making liquid crystals with exceptional UV transparency. As the number of linked cubane units increases, the solubility of [n]cubylcubane plunges; as a result, only limited chain length (up to 40 units) have been successfully synthesized in solutions. The skeleton of [n]cubylcubanes is still composed of enormously strained carbon cubes, which therefore limit its stability. In contrast, researchers at Penn State University showed that poly-cubane synthesized by solid-state reaction is 100% sp3 carbon bonded with a tetrahedral angle (109.5°) and exhibits exceptional optical properties (high refractive index).

Reactions
Cuneane may be produced from cubane by a metal-ion-catalyzed σ-bond rearrangement.

With a rhodium catalyst, it first forms syn-tricyclooctadiene, which can thermally decompose to cyclooctatetraene at 50–60 °C.

See also
Basketane

References

External links
 Eaton's cubane synthesis at SynArchive.com
 Tsanaktsidis's cubane synthesis at SynArchive.com
 Cubane chemistry at Imperial College London

Polycyclic nonaromatic hydrocarbons
Molecular geometry
Theoretical chemistry
Cyclobutanes
Substances discovered in the 1960s
Pentacyclic compounds